Jayden Ross Levitt (born 23 June 1986) is a South African born English cricketer.  Levitt is a right-handed batsman who bowls right-arm off break.  He was born in Johannesburg, Transvaal Province
Levitt made his debut in Minor counties cricket for Wiltshire against Cheshire in the 2007 Minor Counties Championship.  To date, he has made sixteen Minor Counties Championship and eight MCCA Knockout Trophy appearances for the county.  In 2011, he joined the Unicorns to play in the Clydesdale Bank 40.  He made his List A debut for the team against Gloucestershire and followed this up with two further appearances against Somerset and Glamorgan.  In Levitt's three matches he scored 65 runs at an average of 21.66, with a high score of 33.

References

External links
Jayden Levitt at ESPNcricinfo

1986 births
Living people
Cricketers from Johannesburg
English sportspeople of South African descent
English cricketers
Wiltshire cricketers
Unicorns cricketers
English cricketers of the 21st century